Aberin is a municipality located in the province and autonomous community of Navarre, northern Spain.

References

External links
 ABERIN in the Bernardo Estornés Lasa - Auñamendi Encyclopedia (Euskomedia Fundazioa) 

 auto

Municipalities in Navarre